This is a list of bridges and other crossings of the Cuyahoga River from its mouth at Lake Erie upstream to its source at Burton, Ohio. The list includes current road and rail crossings, as well as various other crossings of the river.

All locations are in the U.S. state of Ohio.

Crossings

See also

References
Notes

Citations

Bibliography

For further reading

External links

Bridges of Northeastern Ohio

Bridges in Ohio
Bridge crossings
Bridges in Cleveland
Cuyahoga River crossings
Cuyahoga River